Yvette Tulip Hlaváčová (born 26 May 1975) is a Czech former swimmer.

Swimming career
Hlaváčová was a Czech national team member in long-distance swimming and won a silver medal at the 1991 European Aquatics Championships in the 5 km open water and a bronze medal at the 1995 European Aquatics Championships in the 25 km open water event.

Despite being of Czech nationality she won the 50 metres butterfly title in 1998 at the ASA National British Championships.

She is the women's world record holder from swimming the English Channel in a time of 7 h, 25 mins. While she has pursued indoor swimming, she has earned much more success on the open water. The swimmer has been at the top of long-distance swimming for several years.

At 6ft4.5" (194 cm) she is one of the tallest swimmers in the world. Her feet are a size 13 (US) / 46 (EU).

Successful English Channel Swims
 2005 in 8 h 42 mins
 2006 in 7 h 25 mins (WR)
 2007 in 7 h 53 mins

References

External links
 The Interview with Yvetta Hlaváčová - Czech.cz, official portal of the Czech Republic
Profile and picture of Yvetta at Dover Life

1975 births
Living people
People from Boskovice
Czech female swimmers
Female long-distance swimmers
English Channel swimmers
Sportspeople from the South Moravian Region
20th-century Czech women
21st-century Czech women